Olukkoyağı is a village in Tarsus district of Mersin Province, Turkey. The population of village was 616  as of 2012. There is a trout farm in the location named Papazınbahçesi for production of a trout species named salma trıutta.

References

External links
For images

Villages in Tarsus District